Arkwright Town could be:

  Arkwright Town in Derbyshire, England
  Arkwright, Alabama, USA
  Arkwright, Georgia, USA
  Arkwright, New York, USA